</noinclude>

The USA Track & Field Outdoor Championships is an annual track and field competition organized by USA Track & Field, which serves as the American national championships for the sport. Since the year 1992, in the years which feature a Summer Olympics, World Athletics Championships, Pan American Games, NACAC Championships, or an IAAF Continental Cup, the championships serve as a way of selecting the best athletes for those competitions.

History
The history of the competition starts in 1876, when the New York Athletic Club (NYAC) decided to organize a national championships. Having previously held the NYAC Spring and Fall Games. The seventh, eight, and ninth edition of the Fall Games became the country's first, second and third national track and field championships. The Amateur Championship of America (prior to N.A.A.A.) 1876 to 1878 were all held in Mott Haven, New York.  April 22, 1879 N.A.A.A. was formed. The National Association of Amateur Athletes of America (N.A.A.A.), began sponsoring the meeting in 1879, and organized the championships up to 1887. Past N.A.A.A. presidents were 1879 George W Carr was elected president,  1880 & 1881 & 1882 A. H. Curtis was elected president, 1883 & 1884 & 1885 Gilbert H Badeu elected president, and 1887 Walter Storm was elected.  At this point, the Amateur Athletic Union (AAU), a more powerful athletic organization, began to hold their own version of the national championships. Two national championships were held in 1888, but the NAAA disbanded after this. The NAAA Championships 1879 to 1888 were all held in New York. Sept 19, 1888 the First AAU Outdoor Championship was held in Detroit, MI.  Sept 14, 1889 Second Annual AAU T&F Championship competition was held at Travers Island, NY.  Oct 11, 1890 Third Annual AAU T&F National Championship competition was held at Washington, DC.  The AAU was the sole organizer of the event for the next ninety years. In 1923, the AAU also sponsored the first American Track & Field championships for women.

As a result of the Amateur Sports Act of 1978, the AAU had no longer power over Olympic sports in the United States. A spin-off group, The Athletics Congress, held its first national track and field championships in 1980. The Athletics Congress was renamed USA Track & Field in 1993, and they have organized the annual championships ever since.

2020 Olympic Trials Held 2021
United States Olympic & Paralympic Committee (USOPC), and the TrackTown USA Local Organizing Committee announced the release of the updated competition schedule for the 2020 U.S. Olympic Team Trials – Track and Field, that will take place June 18-27, 2021, at Hayward Field in Eugene, Oregon.

Events
The following athletics events are currently featured on the national championships' program:

 Sprint: 100 m, 200 m, 400 m
 Middle distance track events: 800 m, 1500 m
 Long distance track events: 5000 m, 10,000 m
 Hurdles: 100 m hurdles, 110 m hurdles, 400 m hurdles, 3000 m steeplechase
 Jumps: long jump, triple jump, high jump, pole vault
 Throws: shot put, discus, hammer, javelin
 Combined events: heptathlon, decathlon
 Walks: 20 km walk (road) / 20000 m walk (track)

In earlier editions before 1974, running distances were often measured in yards.  All races were in yards until 1928.  From then on, races were measured in meters for Olympic years and yards for other years, except 1933 to 1951 inclusive and 1959. In the early years, the 220 yard hurdles were included for many years in lieu of the 440 yard hurdles. The 220 yard hurdles were first included 1887 through 1962.  USATF website lists Past Outdoor Champions (all events) on the statistic section of their website.

The cover page of the 1888 Program states "First Annual Championship Games Amateur Athletic Union of the United States".

Editions

Split gender editions

Note that the track surface changed over these years.  Synthetic tracks were used in the men's editions in 1963 (rubber), 1965, 1969, 1971, 1972 and from 1974 on.  The tracks in the other years were cinders, sometimes with a mix of brick (1967, 1970 and 1973).  1923 was the First AAU Women’s National Championship.

Men only editions

NAAA National Championships (prior to AAU) 1879 to 1888

In 1888 there was both a NAAA and AAU Championships.  Competitions were held at various athletic clubs grounds.

1888 Manhattan AC grounds, New York city Oct. 13, 1888

1887 Manhattan AC grounds, New York city Sept 17, 1887

1886-2 NYAC grounds, Mott Haven, NY  Sept 18, 1886

1886-1 Staten Island AC grounds, West Brighton, Staten Island June 26, 1886

1885 Manhattan AC grounds, New York city June 13 or 18, 1885

1884 Williamsburg AC grounds, Brooklyn Sept 28, 1884

1883 NYAC grounds, Mott Haven, NY    June 3, 1883

1882 Polo grounds, New York city June 10, 1882

1881 NYAC grounds, Mott Haven, NY    Sept 24, 1881

1880 NYAC grounds, Mott Haven, NY    Sept 25, 1880

1879 NYAC grounds, Mott Haven, NY    Sept 27, 1879

Amateur National Championships (prior to NAAA) 1876 to 1879

In 1879 the meet doubled at the 1st AAU Championship.

1878 Mott Haven, NY  Oct 12, 1878

1877 Mott Haven, NY Sept 8, 1877

1876 Mott Haven, NY  Sept 30, 1876  

The 1876 Amateur Championship included the following winners: Frederick C Saportas (100), Edward Merritt (440), Harold Lambe (Canadian) (880 and mile), George Hitchcock (120 hurdles), H Edwards Fickens (HJ), Isaiah Frazier (LJ), Harry Buermeyer (SP), William Buckingham Curtis(HT), and D M Stern & Charles Connor (Walks).

Records

Most successful athletes

By event

See also
USA Track & Field Indoor Championships
United States Olympic Trials (track and field)
USA Marathon Championships
USA Half Marathon Championships
USA Cross Country Championships

References

Champions
United States Championships (Women). GBR Athletics. Retrieved on 2015-06-28.
United States Championships (Men 1876-1942). GBR Athletics. Retrieved on 2015-06-28.
United States Championships (Men 1943-). GBR Athletics. Retrieved on 2015-06-28.

External links
Official website from USATF
A brief history of the US national championship  from Track & Field News
Past results from Track & Field News
 Past Champions from USATF
 Past Locations of Championships (Back pages of USATF Outdoor Champions PDF).

 

 
Track and field competitions in the United States
United States athletics (track and field) championships
Track and field
National athletics competitions
Recurring sporting events established in 1876